Captain R. Tamil Selvan is a leader of Bharatiya Janata Party. He is elected to Maharashtra Legislative Assembly both in 2014 and 2019 from Sion-Koliwada constituency. He served as a corporator in Mumbai Municipal Corporation. He saved around 36 lives at CSMT when Kasab and his associate started firing during the 26/11 Mumbai attacks.

References

Living people
Maharashtra MLAs 2014–2019
Bharatiya Janata Party politicians from Maharashtra
Maharashtra MLAs 2019–2024
1958 births